Jumping Park (점핑파크) is the ski jumping hills in the Muju Resort. It is located in Muju, South Korea. The ski jumping hills consist of a large hill with a K-point of 120, a normal hill with a K-point of 90, and two training hills. It hosted the ski jumping at the 1997 Winter Universiade. The latest events at the venue was the summer ski jumping held in September 2008.

See also 
 Muju Resort
 1997 Winter Universiade

References

External links 
 Official website 

Sports venues in South Korea
Muju County
Hills of South Korea
Ski jumping venues in South Korea